1999 Remixes is the third compilation album released by British funk/acid jazz band Jamiroquai. Released on 20 September 1999, the album features a selection of remixes based on tracks included on the group's fourth studio album, Synkronized. The album was available as a package, containing four 12" records.

Track listing

References

Jamiroquai remix albums
1999 remix albums
1999 compilation albums
S2 Records compilation albums
S2 Records remix albums